Butterflies Are Free is a play by Leonard Gershe.

Loosely based on the life of attorney Harold Krents, the plot revolves around a blind man living in downtown Manhattan whose controlling mother disapproves of his relationship with a free-spirited hippie. The title was inspired by a passage in Charles Dickens' 1853 novel Bleak House: "I only ask to be free. The butterflies are free. Mankind will surely not deny to Harold Skimpole what it concedes to the butterflies."

After 12 previews, the Broadway production, directed by Milton Katselas, opened on October 21, 1969 at the Booth Theatre, where it ran for 1,128 performances. The original cast consisted of Keir Dullea, Blythe Danner, Eileen Heckart, and Paul Michael Glaser. Replacements during the run included Gloria Swanson, Pamela Bellwood, Kipp Osborne and David Huffman. 

The title song, which was performed in the play as an original composition by the blind character played by Keir Dullea, was written by composer/lyricist Stephen Schwartz.  Dullea subsequently recorded the song for his 1969 self-titled solo album.  It was also covered and released as a single by a number of other artists including The Cinnamon Ship (in a version arranged and produced by Schwartz), The Free Design, Ed Ames and The Going Thing. 

Gershe, Katselas, Heckart, and Glaser were reunited for the 1972 screen adaptation (set in North Beach, San Francisco) with Edward Albert and Goldie Hawn. Heckart won an Academy Award for best supporting actress for her role in the film.

Broadway awards and nominations

References

External links

1969 plays
Broadway plays
American plays adapted into films
Plays set in New York City